Celia Tapias (born in the city of Buenos Aires on December 21, 1885, died in her hometown on November 28, 1964) was the first female lawyer to practice in the City of Buenos Aires, the second in her country. She attended the baccalaureate in Buenos Aires, and after her graduation in 1904, she entered the Faculty of Law of the University of Buenos Aires. In 1910, she obtained the title of lawyer and in 1911 the doctorate with a thesis on Tutela dativa, becoming the first lawyer in the city of Buenos Aires.

References

1885 births
1964 deaths
Lawyers from Buenos Aires
Academic staff of the University of Buenos Aires
20th-century Argentine lawyers
Argentine women lawyers